Seer stone may refer to:

 Seer stone (Latter Day Saints)
 Palantír, a fictional magical artefact from Tolkien's legendarium

See also
 The Seeing Stone, a 2000 novel by Kevin Crossley-Holland